Belleisle Creek is a Canadian rural community in Kings County, New Brunswick, west of the town of Sussex. Belleisle Creek is surrounded by rolling hills of the Caledonia Highlands. It records some of the highest snowfalls in the Maritime Provinces.

History

Notable people

See also
List of communities in New Brunswick

References

Communities in Kings County, New Brunswick